This is a list of all Coleophora species. Coleophora is a very large genus of moths of the family Coleophoridae. It contains some 1,350 described species. The genus is represented on all continents, but the majority are found in the Nearctic and Palaearctic regions. Many authors have tried splitting the genus into numerous smaller ones, but most of these have not become widely accepted.

List of species
Species placed (at least provisionally) in Coleophora include:

A B C D E F G H I J K L M N O P Q R S T U V U W X Y Z

A

B

C

D

E

F

G

H

I

J

K

L

M

N

O

P

Q

R

S

T

U

V

W

X

Y

Z

Species of unknown status
Coleophora defessella Herrich-Schäffer, 1855 This species was described from Germany.
Coleophora leucogrammella Herrich-Schäffer, 1855. This species was described from the Alps. The identity remains questionable.  It has been recorded feeding on the leaves of Inula conyza. The larvae live in a black, laterally compressed, bivalved case with a mouth angle of less than 45°. The larvae have been recorded from autumn to May of the following year.
Coleophora leugrammella Herrich-Schäffer, 1855
Coleophora montihospitella Bruand, 1851
Coleophora poteriella Amsel & Hering 1931 (Nomen nudum)
Coleophora semilineariella Bruand, 1859 (Nomen dubium)
Coleophora thymiella Herrich-Schäffer, 1861 This species was described from Germany.

Excluded species
These species have recently been excluded from the genus Coleophora. However, not all have been placed in another genus yet.
Batrachedra aphypnota Meyrick 1917 (formerly Coleophora aphypnota)
Coleophora crossophanes Meyrick, 1917
Coleophora tarsocoma Meyrick, 1917
Pammeces picticornis (Walsingham, 1897) (formerly Coleophora picticornis)

References

List of Coleophora species
Coleophora